Johanneum may refer to:

 Johanneum (Dresden), a museum building in Dresden, Germany
 Academic School of the Johanneum, short: Johanneum, a school in Hamburg, Germany